Wadi Fara is a seasonal watercourse, or wadi, in Ras Al Khaimah, United Arab Emirates. It runs from the confluence of the Wadi Asimah and Wadi Sidr, to the village of Ghayl.

A wide and fertile wadi, its rich wildlife includes a novel species of diving beetle, Hydroglyphus sinuspersicus, which was first discovered and documented by a joint Czech/Austrian team working in the Wadi Fara in 2009.

The wadi is traditionally settled by members of the Mazari tribe and has a number of historic watchtowers, old villages and farms. A survey of the area carried out in 1955 found 25 households and some 1,200 date palms in the wadi.

See also 
 List of wadis of the United Arab Emirates

References 

Rivers of the United Arab Emirates
Geography of the Emirate of Ras Al Khaimah